Q'illu Urqu (Quechua q'illu yellow, urqu mountain, "yellow mountain", also spelled Ccello Orcco) is a mountain in the Andes of Peru, about  high. It is situated in the Ayacucho Region, Lucanas Province, Chipao District, and in the Parinacochas Province, Coracora District. Q'illu Urqu lies southeast of Suyt'uqucha, Chawpiqucha and Wat'aqucha. Its ridge stretches from southwest to northeast.

References 

Mountains of Peru
Mountains of Ayacucho Region